Sheep-shagger (also spelt sheepshagger or sheep shagger) is a derogatory term, most often used to refer to Welsh people, implying that the subject has sex with sheep. In a court case in Britain, the use of the term directed at a Welsh person was ruled to be a "racially aggravating" factor in a disorderly conduct offence. It has been used in South Africa to refer to Australians and by Australians and New Zealanders to refer to one another.

History 
The use of the term sheep-shagger to refer to a Welsh person has arisen from the prevalence of sheep and sheep farming in Wales. It is often viewed as offensive in Wales, for the same reason as it is in South Africa to refer to Australians. In response to complaints over the use of phrase, in an Australian television advertisement for Toyota, the New Zealand Advertising Standards Authority determined the phrase was not viewed as offensive by the majority of New Zealanders.

Football
At football matches in England, supporters of Welsh teams as well as Welsh players are often called sheep shaggers in football chants from opposing fans. It is also used in Scotland to refer to supporters of Aberdeen. In 2001, Cardiff City signed English player Spencer Prior and jokingly included a contract clause that he would be obliged "to have a physical liaison with a sheep", in response to their fans being called sheep shaggers.

The name "Sheep Shaggers" has been used for at least two football fanzines – those for Bedford Town and for football in Western England.

Music
Manic Street Preachers frontman James Dean Bradfield routinely dealt with sheep-related heckles from gig audiences (including shouts of "sheep shagger", bleats and stuffed toy sheep thrown onstage) with the stock response ‘Yeah, we shag ‘em, then you eat ‘em!"

Court case 
In Prestatyn, Wales, the phrase was the subject of a 2013 court case, after Anthony Taaffe of Bolton, Greater Manchester, England, a guest at a holiday park in Gronant, called an off-duty policeman and security staff "a bunch of sheep-shaggers". Taaffe claimed, in his defence, that the phrase was "a term for people living in the countryside". He also admitted a second similar offence, in which he called a police officer, at the custody unit to which he had been taken, a "Welsh sheep shagger".  Taaffe was fined £150 after he admitted racially aggravated disorderly behaviour.

See also
 List of ethnic slurs by ethnicity
 Anđeli Babilona

References

External links 
 "Welsh Sheep Shaggers : An English Establishment Lie...?" 

Pejorative terms for European people
Association football culture
Sexual slang
Sheep
Zoophilia in culture
English words